Jesse Smith (born August 8, 1989) is an American professional stock car racing driver. He has raced in the NASCAR Camping World Truck Series and the ARCA Racing Series.

Motorsports career results

NASCAR
(key) (Bold – Pole position awarded by qualifying time. Italics – Pole position earned by points standings or practice time. * – Most laps led.)

Camping World Truck Series

 Season still in progress
 Ineligible for series points

ARCA Racing Series
(key) (Bold – Pole position awarded by qualifying time. Italics – Pole position earned by points standings or practice time. * – Most laps led.)

References

External links
 

1989 births
NASCAR drivers
Living people
People from St. Louis County, Missouri
Racing drivers from Missouri
ARCA Menards Series drivers